Carlos González Ferrer (born June 15, 1972), is a former boxer from Xochimilco, Mexico, and a former WBO world junior welterweight champion.

Julio began boxing professionally in 1988, and captured the WBO Light Welterweight Title with a TKO victory over Jimmy Paul in 1992. He defended the title three times before losing it to Zack Padilla in 1993. He captured the title again in 1998 with a TKO win over Giovanni Parisi. He lost the belt in his first defense to Randall Bailey by KO in the first round. He retired in 2005 after being TKO'd by Felix Flores.

See also 
List of Mexican boxing world champions
List of light welterweight boxing champions

External links 
 

1972 births
Living people
Boxers from Mexico City
World boxing champions
Mexican male boxers
Light-welterweight boxers